Melaleuca laetifica is a plant in the myrtle family, Myrtaceae and is endemic to the west coast of Western Australia. It has unusual warty, hairy leaves and heads of bright yellow flowers in spring. It is one of the brightest yellow flowering melaleucas and deserves a place in gardens in semi-dry to temperate areas.

Description
Its branchlets are covered with soft, silky hairs when young but become glabrous as they mature. They also have distinct, raised oil glands, giving the leaf a warty appearance and often there are long, white hairs, especially on the younger leaves.

The flowers are usually bright yellow, sometimes creamy-white and ageing to white. They are arranged in heads on the ends of branches which continue to grow after flowering. There are five bundles of stamens around the flower, each with 12 to 20 stamens.

Taxonomy and naming
Melaleuca laetifica was first formally described in 1999 by Lyndley Craven in Australian Systematic Botany from a specimen collected on the road to Geraldton. The specific epithet (laetifica) refers to the bright, pleasing flowers of this plant species.

Distribution and habitat
This melaleuca occurs in and between the Kalbarri and Hutt River districts in the Geraldton Sandplains biogeographic region. It mostly grows in sand in low heath.

Conservation status
Melaleuca laetifica is listed as "not threatened" by the Government of Western Australia Department of Parks and Wildlife.

Use in horticulture
Melaleuca laetifica is probably the brightest yellow-flowering melaleuca and its low, ground-hugging habit makes it an ideal groundcover or foreground plant. It grows best in semi-dry to temperate areas and may not be suited to the humid east coast of Australia.

References

laetifica
Plants described in 1999
Endemic flora of Western Australia
Taxa named by Lyndley Craven